This Moment Is a Flash is the first studio album by Canadian band Dala. It was released on April 3, 2005 via indie label Big Bold Sun Music.  Upon signing with Universal Music Canada, Drive Through Summer and the duo's cover of Donovan's Catch the Wind were carried over to their major label debut, Angels & Thieves, released the following November.

Track listing

Personnel
 Sheila Carabine - vocals, guitar, piano, keyboards
 Amanda Walther - vocals, guitar, piano, keyboards, ukulele, harmonica
 Mike Roth - guitar, keyboards, producer, engineer
 Adrian Vanelli - drums, percussion
 Andrew Rozalowsky - bass
 Dan Roth - electric guitar
 Tawgs Salter - electric guitar, bass, drums, co-producer, mixer (tk 1)
 Tim Walther - tambourine

In popular culture 
 Fortress is featured in both the series premiere and finale of the Canadian police drama Flashpoint.
 Butterfly to Wasp is featured in the Canadian television program ReGenesis episode 2.7, Talk to Him.

References

External links

2005 albums
Dala (band) albums